Bijoyinee  is an Indian Bengali television soap opera that was premiered on 24 December 2018, and is broadcast on Bengali General Entertainment Channel Star Jalsha and is also available on the digital platform Hotstar The series was starring Swastika Dutta and Rudrajit Mukherjee in lead roles with Anjana Basu in a negative role. It marks the come back of Anjana Basu into Bengali television. The show is produced by Boyhood Productions.

Plot
Bijoyinee is the tale of Keka,  daughter of a maid servant at a wealthy house, and her struggles to become a great dancer. Her main problem is that a well-known classical dancer, Subarna, whose house her mother works at, detests her and prevents her from working in the dance industry because of her lower status.

Cast

Main cast
 Lekha Chatterjee / Swastika Dutta as keka and Mohini
Sambhabhi as child Keka
 Imtiaz Haque / Rudrajit Mukherjee as Ritwik
Samriddho as Child Ritwik
 Anjana Basu as Subarna, Ritwik's mother, a renowned classical dancer. 
 Ratri Ghatak as Monika aka Mani (Kekas Mother)

Support cast
 Madhurima Basak as Nupur
 Akash Ghosh as Chotu
 Anirban Ghosh as Snehasish
 Arpita Mondal as Rinku
 Joy Bhattacharya as Jatin
 Sukanya Dutta as Naina
 Purbasha Debnath as Tutul
 Antara Sarkar as Mithu
 Dipa Roy as Gopali Jethi
 Krishnakishore Mukherjee as Indra
 Sanjoy Bapi Basu as Raghab
 Avery Singha Roy as Anamika
 Vivaan Ghosh as Taposh
 Debika Mitra as Thammi

References

Bengali-language television programming in India
2018 Indian television series debuts
Star Jalsha original programming
2019 Indian television series endings